Pescorocchiano is a  (municipality) in the Province of Rieti in the Italian region of Latium, located about  northeast of Rome and about  southeast of Rieti.

Pescorocchiano borders the following municipalities: Borgorose, Carsoli, Collalto Sabino, Fiamignano, Marcetelli, Petrella Salto, Sante Marie, Tornimparte, Varco Sabino. It is located not far from the Lago del Salto and is a typical agricultural municipality, renowned for the production of chestnut. The frazione (separated hamlet) of Civitella di Nesce, was most likely the seat of the Res publica Aequiculorum, an ancient Roman municipium in the former territory of the Aequi.

References

External links
 Official website

Cities and towns in Lazio